Strada statale 148 Pontina (SS 148), previously known as Strada regionale 148 Pontina (SR 148), is a highway that connects Rome to Terracina, passing through Latina and through the localities of Pomezia, Ardea in the Metropolitan City of Rome and for Aprilia, Pontinia and Sabaudia in province of Latina.

History 
Traced on the route of the ancient via Pontina or via Severiana, the northern section, between Rome and Borgo Piave (LT), was built in the forties and inaugurated in 1950. The southern section, between Borgo Piave and Terracina, was built between the sixties and seventies with the name of  "via Mediana", integrating and expanding the existing road network, including in particular a large part of the reclamation road called "via Lunga" built in the thirties for the reclamation of the Agro Pontino.

In 1998 the government decided to devolve to the Regions all the state roads that were not considered of "national importance". The list of those roads, compiled in 2000, defined the state road nr. 148 of "regional interest", and therefore it was devolved to the Lazio region effectively from 1 February 2002, which then devolved the competences to the provinces of Rome and Latina for the relevant sections; from 5 March 2007, the management was entrusted to ASTRAL S.P.A.; from 21 January 2019 management has returned to ANAS.

References 

148
Transport in Rome
Transport in Lazio